The 2017–18 Fort Wayne Mastodons men's basketball team represented Indiana University – Purdue University Fort Wayne during the 2017–18 NCAA Division I men's basketball season. The Mastodons were led by fourth-year head coach Jon Coffman and played their home games at the Gates Sports Center and the Allen County War Memorial Coliseum as members of the Summit League. They finished the season 18–15, 7–7 in Summit League play to finish in fourth place. On December 18th, 2017 the Fort Wayne Mastodons traveled to Bloomington for a game with the state powerhouse Indiana Hoosiers. In a stunning upset they beat Indiana on their home court for the first time ever on national television. They lost in the quarterfinals of the Summit League tournament to North Dakota State. They were invited to the CollegeInsdier.com Tournament where they lost in the first round to Central Michigan.

The season was the last in which the Mastodons represented IPFW. On July 1, 2018, IPFW will split into two separate institutions. The school's academic programs in health sciences will be governed solely by Indiana University under the banner of Indiana University Fort Wayne. All other academic programs will be governed solely by Purdue University as Purdue University Fort Wayne. The athletic program will continue to use its current branding as the Fort Wayne Mastodons, but will exclusively represent Purdue Fort Wayne, with the school colors changing to the old gold and black used by Purdue's main campus.

Previous season 
The Mastodons finished the 2016–17 season 20–13, 8–8 in Summit League play to finish in a three-way tie for fourth place. They lost in the quarterfinals of the Summit League tournament to Omaha. They were invited to the CollegeInsider.com Tournament where they defeated Ball State in the first round and received a second round bye before losing in the quarterfinals to Texas A&M–Corpus Christi.

Preseason 
In a poll of league coaches, media, and sports information directors, the Mastodons were picked to finish in fourth place. Junior guard John Konchar was named to the preseason All-Summit First Team and senior guard Bryson Scott was named to the Second Team.

Roster

Schedule and results

|-
!colspan=9 style=| Non-conference regular season

|-
!colspan=9 style=| Summit League regular season

|-
!colspan=9 style=|Summit League tournament

|-
!colspan=9 style=|CIT

References

Purdue Fort Wayne Mastodons men's basketball seasons
Fort Wayne
Fort Wayne
Fort Wayne
Fort Wayne